Rhodri Hughes (born 26 November 1993) is a Welsh rugby union player who plays for Ospreys regional team as a lock. He was also a Wales under-20 international.

Hughes made his debut for the Ospreys regional team in 2012 having previously played for the Ospreys academy, Aberavon RFC, Hendy RFC, Swansea RFC and Bridgend Ravens.

References 

1993 births
Living people
Ospreys (rugby union) players
Rugby union locks
Rugby union players from Swansea